Soshte is a Maharashtrian surname belonging to the Twashta Kasar community hailing from the Shilaharas Old destroyed Salsette (साष्टी) island in Maharashtra state on India's west coast. The metropolis of Mumbai (formerly Bombay) and the city of Thane lie on this island, making it the 14th most populous island in the world.

History 

The name Sashti means "sixty-six villages." Present-day Sashti Island was formerly several separate islands. Most of the northern and middle part of the present island were part of historic Sashti island, while the southern part of the island, which includes Mumbai City, was originally seven small islands (Mahim, Bombay, Mazagaon, Parel, Colaba, Little Colaba, and Sion), extending south from Sashti. The island of Trombay lay to the southeast of Sashti.

Gotra 

Soshte surnames Gotra is Bhrugu (the word "gotra" means "lineage" in the Sanskrit language. Among those of the Hindu caste, gotras are reckoned patrilineally. Each gotra takes the name of a famous Rishi or sage who was the patrilineal forebear of that clan. And each Gotra is addressed by the suffix 'sa' or 'asa' as relevant).

References 

Social groups of Maharashtra
Social groups of India
Culture of Mumbai